The 1947 Florida State Seminoles football team was an American football team that represented Florida State University as an independent during the 1947 college football season. In its first and only season under head coach Ed Williamson, the team compiled a 0–5 record and was outscored by a total of 90 to 18. The team played its home games at Centennial Field in Tallahassee, Florida.

In September 1947, the Florida State College for Women became coeducational, was renamed Florida State University and announced that it would field a football team, though it had no plans to compete with the University of Florida "for some time to come." The 1947 team was Florida State's first football team since 1904, after which Florida State became a women's college. Ed Williamson served as both athletic director and football coach and vowed to develop "a 'well rounded athletic program' without particular emphasis on football or any other single sport."

In five games during the 1947 season, the team gained only 687 yards from scrimmage. The team completed 32 of 87 passes for 400 yards and 14 interceptions. "Red" Parrish was the team's leading rusher with 111 yards. Fullback Kenneth McLean led the team with 150 yards of total offense (105 rushing yards, 45 passing yards).

Schedule

References

Florida State
Florida State Seminoles football seasons
College football winless seasons
Florida State Seminoles football